Western Bosnia may refer to:

 Western Bosnia
 Autonomous Province of Western Bosnia, a self-proclaimed autonomous entity that existed during the Bosnian War